Vladimir Harutyunyan (born 18 July 1998) is an Armenian diver. He competed in the men's 10 m synchro platform event at the 2018 European Aquatics Championships, winning the bronze medal. He and his partner Lev Sargsyan won the first medal for Armenia at the European Aquatics Championships.

References

1998 births
Living people
Armenian male divers
Place of birth missing (living people)
European Championships (multi-sport event) bronze medalists